The National Police of the Principality of Liechtenstein, is the national police force of Liechtenstein. It is composed of 125 employees, with 91 officers and 34 staff (excluding the Security Corps), who police the  doubly landlocked alpine state in Western-Central Europe. Bordered by Switzerland to its west, and Austria to its east, Liechtenstein maintains a trilateral treaty which enables close cross-border co-operation between the police services of the three states. Liechtenstein is also a member of Interpol, and a signatory to a variety of other treaties.

Crime
Liechtenstein has a significantly low crime rate, with the last murder taking place in April 2014. Crime has always been low since the mid-1970s when Liechtenstein started to prosper as a nation. According to an International Special Reports study, the average Liechtenstein resident doesn't even lock their door. Liechtenstein jails hold very few, if any, inmates, with sentences over two years being transferred to Austria. However, officers in the National Police have been armed since a shooting took place. In 2004, Liechtenstein drafted 300 Swiss and Austrian police to assist security forces in the potential aftermath of a Liechtenstein victory over England, in a Euro Cup qualifying match, at Rheinpark Stadion.

Structure
The National Police are divided into three divisions, and two independently operated subdivisions:

 Security and Traffic Control (64 officers; 5 civilian men and women); Administration Security and Traffic Unit, Security Unit, Traffic Unit, Traffic Engineering and Prevention Unit, Intervention Unit (police tactical unit), Border Unit, Riot Police, and Protection Unit.
 Criminal Investigation (16 officers; 10 civilian men and women); Administration Crime Investigation Division, Serious Crime Unit, Trace Unit, Financial Crime Unit, Forensic Unit, Crime Intelligence Unit. Officers are generally issued a SIG Sauer pistol, the standard issue being the SIG Sauer P226.
 Executive Support (7 officers; 15 civilian men and women); Chief of Staff, Systems Organization and Quality Department, Logistics, Emergence Command and Dispatch, Information Technology, State Penitentiary, and Relations Unit.
 Chief of Staff and Commissioner's Office (3 officers; 7 civilian men and women); Traffic and Administration Law Department, Legal Assistant, Commissioner's Office; Public Information Center, and Finance and Controlling.
Security Corps (38 militiamen) The Security Corps are a paramilitary force, composed entirely of Liechtensteiners, who can be called upon in case of a natural disaster, or riot situation. The Corps also performs honorary roles such as changing the guard, and presenting the Coat of Arms at official occasions. Differing from all other units (except for the Special Police Unit), the Corps are trained and equipped with weapons such as Heckler & Koch UMPs and Heckler & Koch MP5s.

Security
Law enforcement in Liechtenstein is handled solely by the National Police, although a paramilitary force is maintained inside the police body. Liechtenstein follows a policy of neutrality, and is one of few countries in the world that maintains no active military. Liechtenstein's Army was abolished in 1868, soon after the Austro-Prussian War in which Liechtenstein fielded an army of 80 men, although they were not involved in any fighting. However, Liechtenstein can reinstate its military if deemed necessary, although this is very unlikely.

Swiss military
Switzerland has a relatively active military due to conscription. Several incidents have occurred during routine training:

On 5 December 1985, an RL-83 Blindicide antitank rocket fired by the Swiss Armed Forces landed in a forest in Switzerland belonging to Balzers, a municipality of Liechtenstein, causing a forest fire. Compensation was paid to the private owner.
On 13 October 1992, following written orders, Swiss Army cadets unknowingly crossed the border and went to Triesenberg to set up an observation post. Swiss commanders had overlooked the fact that Triesenberg was not in Swiss territory. Switzerland apologized to Liechtenstein for the incident.
On 3 March 2007, a company of 171 Swiss soldiers mistakenly entered Liechtenstein in bad weather at night, after taking a wrong turn in the darkness. The troops returned to Swiss territory before they travelled more than 2 km into the country. The Liechtenstein authorities did not discover the "invaders", and were informed by the Swiss after the incident. The incident was disregarded by both sides. A Liechtenstein spokesman said "It's not like they invaded with attack helicopters".

Policing treaties
Since 1933, the National Police have signed seven strategic treaties.

Working Group Southwest
Europol
International Police Association (IPA)
Interpol
Eastern Swiss police Concordat
Police union boss Constance
Organization for Security and Cooperation in Europe (OSCE)

Emergencies
The national emergency telephone number is 112, for police it is 117, for the Fire Brigade it is 118, for the Ambulance Service it is 144, and for the Rega it is 1414. The Fire Brigade also operates a 30-man volunteer Mountain Rescue Service.  Officer uniforms are similar to that of the Swiss cantonal police, both in color, and design.

Customs control
The Swiss border between Switzerland and Liechtenstein is opened, but Swiss customs officers used to secure Liechtenstein's border with Austria. Before December 2011, there were 21 Swiss, 4 Liechtenstein National Police, and 28 Austria border guards, who secured the 11.6 km long Liechtensteiner-Austrian border, however, only 20 percent is passable. Even though the National Police maintain a border unit, the Swiss border police are responsible for border protection of both countries according to a customs union adopted in 1924.

In February 2007, there were hundreds of people trying to seek asylum in Liechtenstein, mainly from countries such as Somalia and Eritrea. Due to the number of people attempting to cross the border, border guards were stationed on both the Liechtensteiner-Swiss border, and the Liechtensteiner-Austrian border, with the main objective of maintaining law and order for all Liechtensteiners. This security measure lasted for about 90 days, with well over 800 people seeking asylum in Liechtenstein.

In December 2011, Liechtenstein became the fourth non-European Union country to join the Schengen Area after Switzerland, Norway and Iceland. Under the agreement, Liechtenstein will maintain an open border with both Switzerland and Austria, and will therefore, result in the closure of several Liechtensteiner-Austrian border stations. In addition, Balzers Heliport will restrict all helicopters coming from non-Schengen countries, which in theory, should limit security concerns. However, Liechtenstein will strengthen its customs control in the way of a high-tech video surveillance system (over 60 cameras costing $2.3 million), and regular mobile border patrol units.

Border gallery

Notes

References

External links 

Official brochure (in English)

Law enforcement in Liechtenstein
Government of Liechtenstein
National Central Bureaus of Interpol